Juicy Realm is a roguelike video game developed by independent Chinese studio SpaceCan Games and published by X.D. Network]. It's about explorers going into an empire inhabited by sentient fruit and fighting them to save humanity. It was released for Microsoft Windows and OS X on May 3, 2018, and will be ported to the PlayStation 4. Versions for iOS and Android will also be released at the end of 2018. A Nintendo Switch version was released on November 7, 2019.

Gameplay 
Juicy Realm is a roguelike twin-stick shooter where you play as one of the four characters, each with his/her own weapons and gear, to explore the fruits' empire through several maps with procedural-generated zones, monsters, and items. Players will face-off against all sorts of fruits and collect weapons and gear. You can also expand your camp base as you progress. At the end of an area you fight a boss monster. The game can be played alone or with another player.

Development 
The game has been in development for a year by a two-man team at SpaceCan Games, which consists of app developer Tyreal Han and comic artist biboX, who are long-time gamers. BiboX is responsible for the artwork and music. It's the studio's first game for PC and consoles.

Reception 
Prior to the game's release, it was nominated by indiePlay for the Best Game Grand Prize, but won for the Excellence in Visual Art from the same game trade show. Others awards are from the GDC's Indie Mega Booth and Bitsumit Vol. 6.

References 

2018 video games
Indie video games
Roguelike video games
Windows games
MacOS games
PlayStation 4 games
Nintendo Switch games
IOS games
Twin-stick shooters
Video games developed in China